Biltmore Records was a United States based record label active from 1949 through 1951. The label was headquartered in New York City. Biltmore Records were often reissues of recordings no longer in the catalogues of other labels. When RCA Victor found out that Biltmore were making unauthorized reissues of material originally recorded by Victor, they sued Biltmore, putting Biltmore out of business.

They rereleased recordings by Glenn Miller and His Orchestra recorded for Columbia and Brunswick, Benny Goodman, the Original Dixieland Jazz Band, Duke Ellington, Bix Beiderbecke, and Paul Whiteman.

External links
 Biltmore Numerical Listing: http://www.78discography.com/Biltmore.htm

See also
 List of record labels

American record labels
Record labels established in 1949
Record labels disestablished in 1951
Reissue record labels